The 2021–22 All-Ireland Intermediate Club Hurling Championship was  the 17th and current staging of the All-Ireland Intermediate Club Hurling Championship, the Gaelic Athletic Association's intermediate inter-county club hurling tournament. It will be the first club championship to be completed in two years as the 2020-21 series was cancelled due to the COVID-19 pandemic. The championship began on 20 November 2021 and ended on 5 February 2022.

The All-Ireland final was played on 5 February 2022 at Croke Park in Dublin, between Naas from Kildare and Kilmoyley from Kerry, in what was their first ever meeting in a final. Naas won the match by 0-16 to 1-11 to claim their first ever championship title.

Kilmoyley's Daniel Collins was the championship's top scorer with 0-41.

Team summaries

Connacht Intermediate Club Hurling Championship

Connacht Intermediate Club Hurling Championship

Quarter-final

Semi-final

Final

Leinster Intermediate Club Hurling Championship

Leinster Intermediate Club Hurling Championship

First round

Quarter-finals

Semi-finals

Final

Munster Intermediate Club Hurling Championship

Munster Intermediate Club Hurling Championship

Quarter-finals

Semi-finals

Final

Ulster Intermediate Club Hurling Championship

Ulster Intermediate Club Hurling Championship

Quarter-finals

Semi-finals

Final

All-Ireland Intermediate Club Hurling Championship

All-Ireland Intermediate Club Hurling Championship

Semi-finals

Final

Championship statistics

Top scorers

Overall

In a single game

Miscellaneous

 Banagher became the first Derry team to win the Ulster title.
 Kilmoyley became the first Kerry team to win the Munster title.
 Naas become the first Kildare team to win the Leinster title since Ardclough in 2006 and Naas also became the first team from Kildare to win a Club All Ireland title.

References

All-Ireland Intermediate Club Hurling Championship
All-Ireland Intermediate Club Hurling Championship
All-Ireland Intermediate Club Hurling Championship